The Taipei–Keelung metropolitan area also commonly known as Greater Taipei Area is the largest metropolitan area in Taiwan. It is composed of 3 administrative divisions: Taipei, New Taipei City and Keelung. It is the most populous and the most densely populated metropolitan area in Taiwan, with one-third of Taiwanese people living and working there. In some sources Taoyuan City is occasionally considered as part of the metropolitan area on a broader extent, or as an adjacent metropolitan area of its own.

The region is the epicenter of Taiwanese culture, economy, education and government. Designated as a global city, the region exerts a significant impact on commerce, finance, media, art, fashion, research, technology, education, and entertainment, both locally and internationally. As a diplomatic center, it is the home to all consulates and embassies in Taiwan. Its economic power makes the region the country's premier commercial and  financial center as well as in the region of East Asia. Considered to be a global city and rated as an Alpha - City by GaWC, Taipei is part of a major high-tech industrial area. Railways, highways, airports, and bus lines connect Taipei with all parts of the island. The metropolitan area is served by two airports – Songshan and Taoyuan.

Definition

Some international reports consider Taipei–Keelung–Taoyuan as a real complete metropolitan area.

Geography
Due to the geographical characteristics of the area, the Taipei–Keelung metropolitan area roughly corresponds to areas located within the Taipei Basin. Taipei City serves as the core of the metropolitan area where the government of Taiwan and major commercial districts are located.

Geographical Subdivision
The metropolitan area contains Taipei City, Keelung City, and New Taipei City (surrounding the two previous cities). The geographical subdivisions are listed as follows:

GDP
2014 Taipei–Keelung metropolitan area's GDP per capita(PPP) was US$46,102.

Transportation

Rail

The Taipei–Keelung metropolitan area is served by routes of the Taiwan Railway Administration (Western Trunk line, Yilan line, Pingxi line, Shen'ao line) and Taiwan High Speed Rail which connect the area with all parts of the island.

Mass Rapid Transit

For rapid transit, Taipei and New Taipei are served by the Taipei Metro with daily trips of over 2 million passengers.
And only Danhai light rail is operated by New Taipei Metro. Also Taoyuan Airport MRT connects Taipei City, New Taipei City, and Taoyuan City with Taoyuan International Airport.

Air
The area is served by Taiwan Taoyuan International Airport for international flights while Songshan Airport is primarily for domestic flights, international flights to Tokyo and Seoul; and also cross-strait flights.

Bus

An extensive bus system serves the metropolitan area.

See also
Administrative divisions of Taiwan
Geography of Taiwan
List of metropolitan areas in Asia by population
List of Taiwanese counties and cities by area
List of Taiwanese counties and cities by population
List of Taiwanese counties and cities by population density
Political divisions of Taiwan (1895-1945)

References

Metropolitan areas of Taiwan
Geography of New Taipei
Geography of Taipei
Geography of Keelung